Aggregate Industries, a member of the Holcim Group, is a company based in the United Kingdom with headquarters at Bardon Hill, Coalville, Leicestershire. Aggregate Industries manufactures and supplies a range of heavy building materials, primarily aggregates such as stone, asphalt and concrete, to the construction industry and other business sectors. Aggregate Industries also manufactures and imports cement, and provides a range of aggregate-associated goods and services, these include the manufacture of masonry and reconstructed stone items for construction industry and domestic applications, the manufacture of pre-cast concrete items, the supply of ready mixed concrete, design and project management consulting, and resurfacing contracting services.

Aggregate Industries operates more than 60 quarries in the UK and has several bases throughout mainland Europe and Scandinavia. Its clients operate in a range of services including construction, aviation, education, horticulture, road building, housing, power and energy and rail.

History
The story of Aggregate Industries began with the Ellis family of Beaumont Leys, which is now part of Leicester. Active Quakers, the family was influential in the Midlands' first public railway, the Leicester and Swannington Railway, which was used to transport granite from local quarries. In time, John Ellis became the local MP and his descendant, Joseph Ellis II, entered into partnership with a Breedon Everard of Groby, initially as coal merchants, later extending their business interests to granite.

In 1858, following the death of Joseph Ellis II, his sons James and Joseph joined with Breedon Everard to lease the Bardon quarries belonging to Robert Jacomb-Hood II of Bardon Hall. Those quarries, now known as Bardon Hills, are still active under the management of Aggregate Industries, and the nearby Bardon Hall is the company's headquarters.

Massachusetts State Police searched the offices of Aggregate Industries, the largest concrete supplier for the underground portions of the Big Dig, in June 2005. They seized evidence that Aggregate delivered concrete that did not meet contract specifications. In March 2006  Massachusetts Attorney General Tom Reilly announced plans to sue project contractors and others because of poor work on the project. Over 200 complaints were filed by the state of Massachusetts as a result of leaks, cost overruns, quality concerns, and safety violations. In total, the state has sought approximately $100 million from the contractors ($1 for every $141 spent).  In May 2006, six employees of the company were arrested and charged with conspiracy to defraud the United States. In July 2007, Aggregate Industries settled the case with an agreement to pay $50 million. $42 million of the settlement went to civil cases and $8 million was paid in criminal fines. The company will provide $75 million in insurance for maintenance as well as pay $500,000 toward routine checks on areas suspected to contain substandard concrete.

Aggregate Industries has subsequently grown, mainly through a series of acquisitions and particularly since 1990. In 2005 the company was acquired by the Swiss-based Holcim Group, which in 2014 was one of the largest cement companies in the world.

In July 2015, Aggregate Industries became a member of LafargeHolcim following a global merger between Lafarge and Holcim, creating the biggest construction materials supplier in the world.

Governance
Aggregate Industries' board is chaired by a representative from Holcim. Other members comprise the Chief Executive Officer, Chief Financial Officer/Deputy Chief Executive and a Non Executive Director. The board oversees performance and ensures that Aggregate Industries complies with the principles of good corporate governance.

Strategy formulation, operational management, performance monitoring and the evaluation of major capital projects fall within the remit of the UK Executive Committee. This comprises the Chief Executive Officer, Chief Financial Officer/Deputy Chief Executive, Organisation & Human Resources Director, and the Directors for the Cement & Concrete Products, Aggregates, Asphalt and Readymix, Contracting and Commercial Divisions.

Products
Goods and services provided by Aggregate Industries include:
 Road surfacing products and contracting service - Aggregate Industries lays, maintains and resurfaces roads, including just under half of the UK's strategic road network.
 Garden and driveway landscaping - the company's Bradstone range is one of the UK's leading names in garden and driveway landscaping and products.
 Masonry - in particular, cast stone walling blocks for interior and exterior use.
 Ready mix concrete and screed - Aggregate Industries is one of the UK's leading suppliers of ready mix concrete, and supplies a wide range of products, chiefly for the construction industry. 
 Roofing tiles - including reconstructed stone roof tiles, which are largely used as an affordable and viable replacement for slate tiles, since these are becoming somewhat difficult to source.
 Staircases and flooring - these products, which include beam and block flooring, hollowcore flooring, staircases and landings, are primarily supplied through Aggregate Industries' sister company, Charcon Construction Solutions.
 Surface water solutions - products to facilitate drainage of surface water.
 Sustainable drainage systems (SUDS) - products to reduce flood risk, using a range of surfacing materials.
 Walling - products in both reconstructed and natural stone, also structural and architectural solutions.
 Aggregates - these include crushed rock, sand and gravel, stone and fill materials. These are mainly used in construction projects.
 Asphalt - Aggregate Industries supplies asphalt (and associated contracting services) for a range of applications including major road projects, airfields, pedestrian footpaths, driveways and sports surfaces. The company produces more than 6 million tonnes of asphalt each year.
 Cement/cementitious materials - Aggregate Industries supplies through it wholly owned subsidiary Lafarge Cauldon Limited, cement, which is used in various forms including ready-mixed and precast concrete, mortars, screed and render. The company also offers a range of sustainable cement replacements including ground granulated blast slag, and fly ash. 
 Commercial hard landscaping - including paving, kerbs and drainage products and technical/design support.
 Concrete blocks - in a wide range of sizes and strengths, including both dense and lightweight, and for a range of applications.

Recognisable products and services
Not all of Aggregate Industries' products and services are marketed under the Aggregate Industries name. Other Aggregate Industries products include:
 Bradstone
 Charcon
 Lafarge Cement
 Express Asphalt
 Garside Sands
 Masterblock
 London Concrete
 Spadeoak
 Witherley
 Aggregate Industries Overseas
 Stalybridge Readymix (SRM)
 Kendall's Readymix
 Maxi Readymix Concrete
 Northumbrian Roads
Source:

Sustainability
While recognising that it operates within an industry marked by high energy consumption and transport needs, Aggregate Industries has a strong commitment to sustainability and to managing the impacts of its work upon people and the environment. It was the first company in the world to be certified to BES 6001, a framework for responsible sourcing of construction materials, by the Building Research Establishment, the first in the construction sector to develop a company-wide Biodiversity Action Plan, in 2002 and the first in the UK to be awarded the Gold standard certificate from the Concrete Sustainability Council in 2020 for supply of its aggregates into Europe. The organisation also has stated commitments and goals relating to carbon and energy, transport, circular econom, waste and water. For example, between 2009 and 2012, the amount of waste it sent to landfill dropped from 52,251 tonnes to 13,555 tonnes.

Aggregate Industries produces a range of products that are designed with sustainability in mind, such as its low carbon, low water 'Life' range.

Logistics
Aggregate Industries delivers a wide range of heavy building materials to clients in many different locations, thus its  logistics needs challenge its commitment to sustainability. However, the organisation aims to make its transport services both efficient and environmentally friendly. As well as using lorries to transport goods, powered by biofuels where possible, Aggregate Industries owns several ships and barges, and is an open access Train Operator. Many of its quarries have railheads on site, allowing materials to be loaded onto the transport vehicle immediately, minimising environmental impact. The company's largest ship, the Yeoman Bridge, can carry around 100,000 tonnes.

The barges, which are based on the River Thames at Gravesend, provide an effective and environmentally friendly way of transporting heavy goods into the heart of London, each carrying around 1,000 tonnes.

Employee relations
Aggregate Industries employs 4,000 people. It has, for many years, administered apprenticeships, young enterprise programmes and work experience, and maintains a graduate training programme. In 2012 it became the first company in its sector to establish a training scheme approved by the Institution of Civil Engineers that allowed participants to work towards achieving professional status.

However, with a predominantly male workforce, many of whom are over 40, Aggregate Industries has also taken steps to safeguard the talent that it already has by encouraging staff to look after their health. During 2014, the company launched its 'Healthy You' programme, designed to raise awareness among staff of the need to address not work-based health and safety issues, but also underlying health concerns such as cardiovascular health, diabetes and mental health. The roll-out of Healthy You was accompanied by the introduction of compulsory occupational health medicals.

In 2014, the company announced that it would invest over £200,000 in placing defibrillators across 220 sites.

Recent and ongoing capital investment
In November 2014, Aggregate Industries announced the completion of a £30 million upgrade of its quarry at Glensanda, in the Scottish Highlands, which is Europe's largest granite quarry. The upgrade included the construction of a new primary crushing machine and new tunnel for transporting the aggregates from the site directly onto waiting ships, and secured 500 Scottish jobs for the next quarter century, that being the predicted lifespan of the crushing machine.

Aggregate Industries' CEO, Pat Ward, described the £30 million investment as being part of an ongoing programme of upgrades which includes new asphalt plants in Sheffield and Heathrow, as well as new crusher machinery at Moorcroft quarry in Plymouth.

Research and innovation

Aggregate Industries has been involved in the creation of England's first certified Passivhaus, Underhill Passivhaus, which is just outside Moreton-in-Marsh in Gloucestershire.

Aggregate Industries is exploring the potential of off-site manufactured housing, made with precast concrete, and insulating concrete formwork 'building shell' systems.

References

External links
Aggregate Industries

Building materials companies of the United Kingdom
British companies established in 1858
Companies formerly listed on the London Stock Exchange
Companies based in Leicestershire
Construction and civil engineering companies of the United Kingdom
1858 establishments in England
Construction and civil engineering companies established in 1858
Holcim Group